2009–10 Moldovan National Division season is the 2nd Moldovan National Division season in the history of FC Sfîntul Gheorghe Chişinău.

Current squad 
Squad given according to the official website as of May 2010,

National Division results

References 

Moldovan football clubs 2009–10 season